Joanne Metcalf (born Los Angeles, 1958) is an American composer. She studied at Duke University with Scott Lindroth and with Louis Andriessen at the Royal Conservatory of Music in The Hague. She currently teaches composition at Lawrence University in Appleton, Wisconsin.

Her Il nome del bel fior (1998), based on the vision of Mary in Canto XXIII of Dante‘s Paradiso, was composed for, and recorded by, the Hilliard Ensemble and Singer Pur.

References

1958 births
Living people
Duke University alumni
American women composers
21st-century American composers
21st-century American women musicians
21st-century women composers